Sandesneben-Nusse is an Amt ("collective municipality") in the district of Lauenburg, in Schleswig-Holstein, Germany. Its seat is in Sandesneben. It was formed on 1 January 2008 from the former Ämter Sandesneben and Nusse.

The Amt Sandesneben-Nusse consists of the following municipalities (with population in 2005):

References

Ämter in Schleswig-Holstein